FC Avtozapchast Baksan was a football team from Baksan, Russia. It played professionally from 1991 to 1997. Its best result was 4th place in the Zone West of the Russian Second Division in 1996.

Team name history
1991–1992: FC Etalon Baksan
1993–1999: FC Avtozapchast Baksan

External links
 Team history at KLISF

Association football clubs established in 1991
Association football clubs disestablished in 2000
Defunct football clubs in Russia
Sport in Kabardino-Balkaria
1991 establishments in Russia
2000 disestablishments in Russia